James Grimston, 2nd Viscount Grimston (9 October 1711 – 15 December 1773) was a British peer and Member of Parliament.

Grimston was the eldest surviving son of William Grimston, 1st Viscount Grimston, and Jean Cooke.

He was elected to the House of Commons for St Albans in 1754, a seat he held until 1761. He appears never to have spoken in the House. In 1756 he succeeded his father in the viscountcy but as this was an Irish peerage it did not prohibit him from sitting in the House of Commons. He also inherited Gorhambury House (now Old Gorhambury House), near St Albans, Hertfordshire.

Lord Grimston married Mary Bucknall, daughter of William Bucknall of Oxhey, Watford and Mary famous portrait as it, in 1746, and had eight children, 3 sons and 5 daughters. He died in December 1773, aged 62, and was succeeded in his titles by his son James. Lady Grimston died in 1778. His second son was the politician William Grimston (1750-1814), who later changed his name to William Bucknall on inheriting the estate of his mother's brother James Askell Bucknall. There is a famous portrait of William's only daughter Sophia as Psyche, painted by Henry Hoppner Meyer. Lord Grimston's daughter Mary married William Hale, grandson of the eminent judge Sir Bernard Hale.

Notes

References
Kidd, Charles, Williamson, David (editors). Debrett's Peerage and Baronetage (1990 edition). New York: St Martin's Press, 1990, 

1711 births
1773 deaths
Viscounts in the Peerage of Ireland
Members of the Parliament of Great Britain for English constituencies
British MPs 1754–1761